Senjahopen or Senjehopen is a village in Senja Municipality in Troms og Finnmark county, Norway. Senjahopen is located along the Mefjorden on the northwest part of the large island of Senja, where it is one of the most important fishing villages on the island.

References

Villages in Troms
Populated places of Arctic Norway
Senja